Showtunes is the fifteenth studio album by American rock band Lambchop. It was released on May 21, 2021, on Merge Records in the United States and on City Slang elsewhere.

Background 
After the festival was cancelled due to COVID-19, Wagner decided to finish these songs in studio.

Showtunes was recorded remotely by Kurt Wagner, the only permanent member of Lambchop. It features as collaborators James McNew of Yo La Tengo, who contributed double bass; CJ Camerieri, who contributed horns and horn arrangements; Jeremy Ferguson, who acted as co-producer and engineer, and Twit One, who co-wrote the track "Fuku".

Unlike Lambchop's previous work, on which Wagner played guitar, Showtunes features Wagner's guitar tracks converted into MIDI piano. Showtunes takes inspiration from musical theatre, hence the name; Wagner called it "show tunes for people who don't like show tunes".

Three singles were released in advance of the album: "A Chef's Kiss", on March 16, 2021; "Fuku", on April 12, 2021, along with an accompanying music video directed by Doug Anderson; and "The Last Benedict", on May 18, 2021.

Critical Reception 

The album was released to positive reviews from music critics, garnering a score of 79 out of 100 on the review aggregator website Metacritic based on nine reviews, indicating "generally favourable reviews", and a score of 7.7/10 from review aggregator website AnyDecentMusic? based on 10 reviews.

Track listing

Charts

References 

2021 albums
Lambchop (band) albums
Merge Records albums
City Slang albums